"Alice" is a song by American singer Lady Gaga recorded for her sixth studio album, Chromatica (2020). It appears as the album's second track, preceded by a string arrangement titled "Chromatica I". It was written by Lady Gaga, BloodPop, Axwell, Justin Tranter, and Johannes Klahr, and produced by BloodPop, Axwell, and Klahr. The song references Lewis Carroll's 1865 children's novel Alice's Adventures in Wonderland. 

The track received generally positive critical reception. In the United States, it appeared at the Billboard Hot Dance/Electronic Songs listing at number 7, while charting in a dozen other countries, including a peak of number 3 in New Zealand. A remix version by Lsdxoxo was released as part of Gaga's remix album, Dawn of Chromatica (2021). Gaga performed "Alice" live on The Chromatica Ball stadium tour (2022).

Background any lyrical content

The song was written by Lady Gaga, BloodPop, Axwell, Justin Tranter, and Johannes Klahr, and produced by BloodPop, Axwell, and Klahr. Talking about the conception of the song, Gaga said: "I had some dark conversations with BloodPop about how I felt about life... So it's this weird experience where I'm going, 'I'm not sure I'm going to make it, but I'm going to try.'" The track references Alice and the fictional setting Wonderland from Lewis Carroll's 1865 children's novel Alice's Adventures in Wonderland, starting with the chorus "My name isn't Alice, but I'll keep looking for Wonderland". The Daily Northwestern Wilson Chapman said the song "uses the Alice in Wonderland tale as a metaphor for struggling to find personal peace". Gaga further elaborated on the song's background on Spotify:

Composition 
The electronica-inspired track demonstrates Gaga's upper register against kick drums and shimmering synths. Lauren Murphy of Entertainment.ie said "Alice" has a "throbbing electronic pop beat". Mark Richardson of The Wall Street Journal described  "Alice" as a "kinetic house track with the trademarks of the genre—hissing offbeat high-hat, neo-Latin keyboards playing a cyclical melody". The Atlantic Spencer Kornhaber said "Gaga sings of her racing mind needing a 'symphony' to clear it" and has a "gasping" chorus. Craig Jenkins of Vulture said the chorus has "booming, chopped-up" vocals, and compared it to "vocal house standards" like "Follow Me" by Aly-Us. Kory Grow of Rolling Stone said the "'ahhs' and an 'oh ma-ma-ma' stutter" in the chorus are reminiscent of the "Ra-ra-roma-ma" of Gaga's "Bad Romance" (2009). Maxine Wally of W magazine said the "call-and-response verses and a huge backing track give off a whiff" of Haddaway's "What Is Love" (1993). The Observer Emily Mackay said the song "takes her down a new rabbit hole, recalling the best of 90s chart house" like Ken Doh's "Nakasaki" and Ultra Naté's "Free".

"Chromatica I"

"Alice" is preceded by an orchestral interlude called "Chromatica I", which opens the album and transitions directly into the track. As Gaga wanted to highlight that the album has three distinct acts, she recruited musician Morgan Kibby to produce interludes for the album, with the help of a 26-person orchestra who performed the string arrangements. Kibby was brought into the studio after submitting the demo that would eventually become "Chromatica I". With the long string runs at the beginning of this composition, Kibby pursued to recall "the majesty and grandeur" of Donna Summer and Gloria Gaynor. She also aimed to reference classic scores from films such as THX 1138 and Outland. In her interview with Zane Lowe on Apple Music's Beats 1, Gaga talked about the background of "Chromatica I":

Callie Ahlgrim of Insider appreciated how "Chromatica I" "blends into 'Alice' very smoothly", while Courteney Larocca from the same publication noted that it sounds like "it's opening a fantasy movie."

Canadian singer and producer Grimes was set to remix the interlude for Dawn of Chromatica, as well as "Chromatica II" and "Chromatica III"; however, her contributions did not make the final cut.

Critical reception
Insider Callie Ahlgrim praised the song for presenting "classic Lady Gaga in all her blood-pumping, bass-thumping glory", and further added that although Alice's Adventures in Wonderland "has become an oft-used reference in pop music", she appreciated "the way it complements the themes of the album; it makes sense to imagine Gaga as a wide-eyed, curious Alice type and 'Chromatica' as a surrealist third space in between earth and escapism." Billboard Stephen Daw ranked "Alice" as Chromatica sixth best track and wrote, "Remember how deliriously entertaining early 2000s post-rave dance music was? Lady Gaga certainly does as she exhibits on ['Alice']... Gaga throws listeners down a sonic rabbit hole of kick drums and shimmering synths..." The magazine's Jason Lipshutz described the song as a "post-rave triumph". Quinn Moreland of Pitchfork considered the lyrics "Maestro, play me your symphony/I will listen to anything/Take me on a trip, DJ, free my mind" one of Chromatica "wild lyrical clunkers". USA Today Patrick Ryan described the song as "hypnotic".

Spencer Kornhaber from The Atlantic listed "Alice" as one of the standout moments of Chromatica with its "gasping chorus."  Lindsay Zoladz of The New York Times said she "can imagine putting the song on repeat during this cruel summer", while the newspaper's Caryn Ganz said "Alice" has "glittery hopefulness". BuzzFeed News''' Alessa Dominguez said that Chromatica "starts strongly" with "Alice" and sees Gaga sing with "glam-theatrical fervor". She added, "The song captures the record's house-inspired sound, its escapist themes of feeling untethered from the world, all complemented by Gaga's vocal theatrics, delivered with operatic flair. As she sings 'Take me home,' you want to follow her down the rabbit hole." Slate Carl Wilson wrote, "this song serves to suck us down the rabbit hole into the album's Wonderland, which Gaga signals is foremost the dance floor... Its brisk house workout, with thematically appropriate downshifted vocal effects. It may not stick in your head. But it sets the mood." Evan 

On a more critical note, Patrick Gomez of The A.V. Club said the song "becomes sleepy as it relies on a generic '90s dance-floor beat throughout". Sawdey of PopMatters called it the record's "least memorable track". Dan Weiss from Spin thought that the Alice in Wonderland metaphors "are sadly not far enough from the shallow".

Commercial performance

In the United States, "Alice" was the "only non-advance track" from the album to debut on the Billboard Hot 100 chart, according to Billboard Gab Ginsberg. The song peaked at number 7 on Billboard Dance/Electronic Songs chart. "Alice" debuted at number 29 on the UK Singles Chart.

Remix
The remix includes heavy beat, and "weighty kick drums". In his review of Dawn of Chromatica, Robin Murray from Clash called Lsdxoxo's "Alice" remix, along with Coucou Chloe's take on "Stupid Love", "dancefloor bumpers". Vinyl Chapters Caillou Pettis found it "a relatively smooth and easygoing track while also managing to bring the goods with the disco elements". Writing for Gigwise, Alex Rigotti opined that the remix version's "energy remains disappointingly static, and it betrays the desperate, almost deluded hope that the original 'Alice' contained."

Live performances

In 2022, Gaga performed "Alice" live at The Chromatica Ball stadium tour as the first song of Act One of the show. Similarly to the album, the song was preceded by the instrumentals of "Chromatica I" as an intro. Gaga appeared on stage lying on an operating table while singing the song. She was wearing a blood-red gown with peak-shoulders–designed by her sister, Natali Germanotta–, along with black leather boots and fingerless gloves. 

In his concert review, NME Nick Levine noted it was a "slightly shocking staging that underlines the thinly veiled mental anguish in her lyrics. 'Where's my body? I'm stuck in my mind', Gaga sings pleadingly." Laviea Thomas of Gigwise also highlighted the performance of song, writing that "belting out some completely unhinged, unearthly and simply iconic screams, 'Alice', is a stomping introductory - I've never heard Gaga scream like this before, her vocal range is truly undefeated."

Credits and personnel
Credits adapted from the liner notes of Chromatica''.

"Alice"

 Lady Gaga – vocals, songwriter
 BloodPop – producer, songwriter, keyboards, bass, drums
 Johannes Klahr – producer, songwriter, keyboards, bass, drums
 Axwell – producer, keyboards, bass, drums
 Justin Tranter – songwriter
 Benjamin Rice – mixer, studio personnel, vocal producer
 Tom Norris – mixer, studio personnel
 E. Scott Kelly – mixer engineer, studio personnel
 Randy Merrill – mastering engineer, studio personnel

"Chromatica I"

 Lady Gaga – composition, production
 Morgan Kibby – composition, production
 Ian Walker – bass
 Giovanna M Clayton – cello
 Timothy E Loo – cello
 Vanessa Freebairn-Smith – cello
 Amie Doherty – conductor
 Allen Fogle – French horn, horn
 Dylan Hurt – French horn, horn
 Katelyn Faraudo – French horn, horn
 Laura K Brenes – French horn, horn
 Mark Adams – French horn, horn
 Teag Reaves – French horn, horn
 Nicholas Daley – trombone
 Reginald Yound – trombone
 Steven M. Holtman – trombone
 Andrew Duckles – viola
 Erol Rynearson – viola
 Linnea Powell – viola
 Meredith Crawford – viola
 Alyssa Park – violin
 Chart Bisharat – violin
 Jessica Guideri – violin
 Luanne Homzy – violin
 Lucia Micarelli – violin
 Marisa Kuney – violin
 Neel Hammond – violin
 Shalini Vijayan – violin
 Songa Lee – violin
 Mike Schuppan – mixing, studio personnel
 Randy Merrill – mastering, studio personnel
 Gina Zimmitti – orchestra contractor
 Whitney Martin – orchestra contractor

Charts

"Alice"

"Chromatica I"

References

External links
 

2020 songs
House music songs
Lady Gaga songs
Music based on Alice in Wonderland
Song recordings produced by BloodPop
Songs written by Axwell
Songs written by BloodPop
Songs written by Justin Tranter
Songs written by Lady Gaga